"Runnin' Away" is a song released by The Voices of Life with lead vocals performed by Sharon Pass, with whom Steve "Silk" Hurley worked also on previous singles (on "Seasons of Love" with leading vocal by Keith Nunnally in 1991, and "The Word Is Love (Silk's Anthem of Life)" that peaked at number twenty-six on the UK Singles Chart in 1998.

The work written by Eric Miller and CeCe Peniston, is likely one of the compositions Peniston planned to include on her cancelled album production on the producer's label.

Credits and personnel
Steve "Silk" Hurley - producer, arranger, mix, engineer
Sharon Pass - lead vocals
E-Smoove - producer, arranger, mix, drum programming
CeCe Peniston - writer
Eric Miller - writer
Ron Hall - bass
Keith Henderson - guitar
Daniel Weatherspoon - keyboards
Tim Dudfield - engineer

Official versions
 12", US, #SENT 0017-1
"Runnin' Away (E-Smoove 'N Silk Original Mix)" - 7:18
"Runnin' Away (E-Smoove 'N Silk Original Mix Instrumental)"
"Runnin' Away (Accapella)"

See also
List of artists who reached number one on the US Dance chart

References

External links
 [ Steve "Silk" Hurley] on AllMusic

2003 singles
Steve "Silk" Hurley songs
Songs written by CeCe Peniston
2003 songs